Corriere delle dame was a weekly Italian language fashion magazine published in Milan, Italy, between 1804 and July 1875. The magazine is one of the pioneers in women's emancipation in Italy.

History and profile
Corriere delle dame was established in 1804. The founder was Carolina Arienti (also known as Carolina Lattanzi), who was married to Giuseppe Lattanzi. She edited the magazine, which included articles about literature and theatre of France and Italy. It targeted men, women and children. However, it was mostly read by women from higher social classes. The magazine is the origin of the Lombard costume.

The magazine was published on a weekly basis. The headquarters of Corriere delle dame was in Milan. In 1811 the number of subscribers was 700. The magazine existed until July 1875.

References

1804 establishments in Italy
1875 disestablishments in Italy
Defunct literary magazines published in Italy
Italian-language magazines
Magazines established in 1804
Magazines disestablished in 1875
Magazines published in Milan
Weekly magazines published in Italy
Women's fashion magazines
Women's magazines published in Italy